The Hawker Hind was a British light bomber of the inter-war years produced by Hawker Aircraft for the Royal Air Force. It was developed from the Hawker Hart day bomber introduced in 1931.

Design and development

An improved Hawker Hart bomber defined by Specification G.7/34, was purchased by the RAF as an interim aircraft, while more modern monoplane bombers such as the Fairey Battle were still in development. Structural elements were a mixture of steel and duralumin with the wings being fabric covered; the main differences compared to the earlier Hart was a new powerplant, (the Rolls-Royce Kestrel V) and the inclusion of refinements from the earlier derivatives such as the cut-down rear cockpit developed for the Demon. The prototype (Serial number K2915) was constructed very rapidly due to Hawker's development work for other proposals and made its first flight on 12 September 1934. A variety of changes were subsequently incorporated ("ram's horn" exhaust manifolds, Fairey-Reed metal propeller and engine improvements) with the first production Hind (K4636) flown on 4 September 1935.

Operational history

The Hind went into service in November 1935 and eventually equipped 20 RAF bomber squadrons. A number were also sold to foreign customers including Afghanistan, the Republic of Ireland, Latvia, Persia (Iran), Portugal, South Africa, Switzerland, and Yugoslavia. By 1937, the Hind was being phased out of front line service, replaced by the Fairey Battle and Bristol Blenheim, with many of the Auxiliary Air Force squadrons changing their role to fighter or maritime patrol units. At the outbreak of the Second World War, 613 Squadron retained the Hind for army co-operation before re-equipping with the Hart derivative, the Hawker Hector, in November 1939.

The Hind found a new career in 1938 as a training aircraft, representing the next step up from basic training on Tiger Moths. It continued in use as an intermediate trainer during the war. Hind trainers were also operated by Canada and New Zealand. In 1941, Hinds flew operations in their original role as light bombers against Axis forces. South African Hinds were employed against Italian forces in Kenya during the East African Campaign and Yugoslav Hinds were used against the Germans and Italians. Iranian Hinds were used briefly against Allied forces during the Anglo-Soviet invasion of Iran. Imperial Iranian Air Force bases were occupied by the Allies and their aircraft were destroyed or dismantled by the invading British. Hawker Hind aircraft were also used by the Afghan government to suppress the tribal revolts of 1944–1947.

Variants

Hind Mk I
Two-seat light bomber aircraft for the RAF, powered by a 477 kW (640 hp) Rolls-Royce Kestrel piston engine.
Afghan Hind
Similar to the Hind Mk I, four aircraft fitted with Rolls-Royce Kestrel V engines, plus another four aircraft fitted with Kestrel UDR engines; eight built for Afghanistan.
Latvian Hind
Two-seat training aircraft, powered by a Bristol Mercury IX radial piston-engine; three built for Latvia.
Persian Hind
Modified version of the Hind Mk I, powered by a Bristol Mercury VIII radial piston-engine; 35 built for Persia.
Portuguese Hind
Similar to the Hind Mk I, two aircraft built as bombers, two aircraft built as trainers; four built for Portugal.
Swiss Hind
Two-seat unarmed communications aircraft; one built for Switzerland.
Yugoslav Hind
Modified version of the Hind Mk I, two aircraft fitted with Rolls-Royce Kestrel XVI piston-engines, one aircraft fitted with a Gnome-Rhone Mistral engine; three built for Yugoslavia.

Operators

 Afghan Air Force acquired 28 aircraft in 1938, the final example retiring in 1956

 Royal Canadian Air Force

 Imperial Iranian Air Force

 Irish Air Corps

 Latvian Air Force

 Royal New Zealand Air Force acquired 78 aircraft of which 63 entered service, primarily as trainers 1940–1943. The other 15 were lost to enemy action in transit.
 No. 3 F.T.S. Ohakea RNZAF
 No. 6 Squadron RNZAF
 No. 20 Squadron RNZAF
 No. 21 Squadron RNZAF
 No. 22 Squadron RNZAF

 Portugal Air Force

 South African Air Force

 Swiss Air Force

Royal Air Force

No. 12 Squadron RAF - October 1936 to February 1938
No. 15 Squadron RAF - March 1936 to July 1938
No. 18 Squadron RAF - April 1936 to May 1939
No. 21 Squadron RAF - December 1935 to August 1938
No. 24 Squadron RAF - Communications use.
No. 34 Squadron RAF - January 1936 to July 1938
No. 40 Squadron RAF - March 1936 to August 1938
No. 44 Squadron RAF - March 1937 to December 1937
No. 49 Squadron RAF - February 1936 to December 1938
No. 50 Squadron RAF - May 1937 to January 1939
No. 52 Squadron RAF - January 1937 to December 1937
No. 57 Squadron RAF - March 1936 to May 1938
No. 62 Squadron RAF - May 1937 to March 1938
No. 63 Squadron RAF - February 1937 to April 1937
No. 64 Squadron RAF
No. 82 Squadron RAF - June 1937 to March 1938
No. 83 Squadron RAF - March 1936 to December 1938
No. 88 Squadron RAF - June 1937 to December 1937
No. 90 Squadron RAF - March 1937 to June 1937
No. 98 Squadron RAF - February 1936 to June 1938
No. 103 Squadron RAF - August 1936 to August 1938
No. 104 Squadron RAF - January 1936 to May 1938
No. 106 Squadron RAF - One flight operated June 1938 to July 1938
No. 107 Squadron RAF - September 1936 to September 1938

No. 108 Squadron RAF - January 1937 to June 1938
No. 110 Squadron RAF - May 1937 to January 1938
No. 113 Squadron RAF - May 1937 to June 1939
No. 114 Squadron RAF - December 1936 to March 1937
No. 139 Squadron RAF - September 1936 to July 1937
No. 142 Squadron RAF - January 1937 to April 1938
No. 185 Squadron RAF - March 1938 to July 1938
No. 211 Squadron RAF - August 1937 to May 1939
No. 218 Squadron RAF - March 1936 to March 1938
No. 267 Squadron RAF
No. 500 Squadron RAF - February 1937 to March 1939
No. 501 Squadron RAF - March 1938 to March 1939
No. 502 Squadron RAF - April 1937 to April 1939
No. 503 Squadron RAF - June 1938 to November 1938
No. 504 Squadron RAF - May 1937 to November 1938
No. 602 Squadron RAF - June 1936 to November 1938
No. 603 Squadron RAF - February 1938 to March 1939
No. 605 Squadron RAF - August 1936 to January 1939
No. 609 Squadron RAF - January 1938 to August 1939
No. 610 Squadron RAF - May 1938 to September 1939
No. 611 Squadron RAF - April 1938 to May 1939
No. 613 Squadron RAF - April 1939 to April 1940
No. 614 Squadron RAF - June 1937 to November 1939
No. 616 Squadron RAF - November 1938 to January 1939

 Royal Yugoslav Air Force

Surviving aircraft
In 1937-39, 28 Hinds were sold to the Afghan government in two batches. After being retired in 1956, two airframes were donated to the United Kingdom in 1967-68. A further two airframes were donated to the National Aeronautical Collection in 1975 by the Afghan president.
 c/n 41.H.8.1899 – Hind on static display at the Royal Air Force Museum London in London.
 c/n 41.H.8.1902 – Hind airworthy with the Shuttleworth Collection in Old Warden, Bedfordshire. It is painted as K5414.
 L7180 – Hind on static display at the Canada Aviation and Space Museum in Ottawa, Ontario. It was flown by the Afghan Air Force through the 1940s and used as an instructional airframe to train aircraft engineers during the 1950s.
 L7181 – Hind under restoration at the Imperial War Museum Duxford in Duxford, Cambridgeshire. It was built in 1937 and served with No. 211 Squadron RAF until being sold to Afghanistan in 1939, and is undergoing long-term restoration by the Historic Aircraft Collection, having previously been in the Canada Aviation Museum collection.
 K6717 – Hind on static display at the Museum of Transport and Technology in Western Springs, Auckland.
 NZ1517 – Hind under restoration to airworthy at the Classic Aircraft Collection in Dairy Flat, Auckland. It was previously operated by the Royal New Zealand Air Force.
 NZ1535 – Hind under restoration to airworthy at the Classic Aircraft Collection in Dairy Flat, Auckland. It was previously operated by the Royal New Zealand Air Force.

Specifications (Hind)

See also

References

Notes

Bibliography
 Crawford, Alex. Hawker Hart Family. Redbourn, Hertfordshire, UK: Mushroom Model Publications Ltd., 2008. .
 Mason, Francis K. The British Bomber Since 1914. London: Putnam Aeronautical Books, 1994. .
 Mason, Francis K. Hawker Aircraft since 1920. London: Putnam, Third revised edition 1991, first edition 1961. .

 Thetford, Owen. Aircraft of the Royal Air Force 1918-57. London: Putnam, 1st edition, 1957.
 Thetford, Owen "By Day and By Night: Hawker Hart and Hind". Aeroplane Monthly, August 1995, Vol. 23, No. 8. pp. 34–43. .

External links

 Hawker Hind
 Hawker Hind – British Aircraft of world War II
 The Hawker Hind in Canada

1930s British bomber aircraft
Hind
Biplanes
Single-engined tractor aircraft
Aircraft first flown in 1934